Advance is a city located at the intersection of State Highway 25 and State Highway 91/Route C in northern Stoddard County, Missouri, United States. The population was 1,347 at the 2010 census. Advance was founded circa 1882. The town is pronounced ADD-vance.

History 
Advance had its start in 1910 when the railroad was extended to that point.

Economy
There is no sustained industry in the town or near surrounding area. Agriculture, although small, is the most viable local source of income.

Public services available in the city include three health/medical clinics: Advance Medical Clinic, Cross Trails Medical Center and Haven Health Care Medical. There are two parks within the city limits: Umfleet Park and the Advance Ballpark, the latter of which is where high school baseball and softball games are played as well as summer league T-ball and also has tennis courts and a sand volleyball court. The town also has one lending library: the Advance Community Library.

Advance is governed by a mayor-council form of government with Ryan Slinkard, currently serving as mayor. The city also has a police department with two full-time and two reserve officers. The Advance Volunteer Fire Department has approximately 15 firefighters with five vehicles.

There are no hospitality services or full-service medical facilities; the closest hotels and hospitals are located about 20–25 miles each direction in Dexter (south) and Cape Girardeau (east).

Geography
Advance is located at  (37.104227, -89.911575).

Climate 
The climate in this area is characterized by relatively high temperatures and evenly distributed precipitation throughout the year.  According to the Köppen Climate Classification system, Advance has a humid subtropical climate, abbreviated "Cfa" on climate maps.

Demographics

2010 census
As of the census of 2010, there were 1,347 people, 578 households, and 356 families residing in the city. The racial makeup of the city was 98.74% White, 0.07% Black or African American, 0.30% Native American, 0.15% Asian, and 0.74% from two or more races. Hispanic or Latino of any race were 0.64% of the population.

There were 578 households, of which 28.7% had children under the age of 18 living with them, 43.8% were married couples living together, 12.1% had a female householder with no husband present, 5.7% had a male householder with no wife present, and 38.4% were non-families. 35.1% of all households were made up of individuals, and 21.7% had someone living alone who was 65 years of age or older. The average household size was 2.26 and the average family size was 2.86.

The median age in the city was 41.6 years. 21.2% of residents were under the age of 18; 9.5% were between the ages of 18 and 24; 21.8% were from 25 to 44; 22.8% were from 45 to 64; and 24.8% were 65 years of age or older. The gender makeup of the city was 46.7% male and 53.3% female.

2000 census
As of the census of 2000, there were 1,244 people, 544 households, and 348 families residing in the city. The population density was 1,428.8 people per square mile (552.1/km). There were 593 housing units at an average density of 681.1 per square mile (263.2/km). The racial makeup of the city was 98.31% White, 0.08% African American, 0.56% Native American, 0.16% Asian, and 0.88% from two or more races. Hispanic or Latino of any race were 0.32% of the population.

There were 544 households, out of which 25.4% had children under the age of 18 living with them, 49.4% were married couples living together, 11.2% had a female householder with no husband present, and 36.0% were non-families. 34.6% of all households were made up of individuals, and 24.1% had someone living alone who was 65 years of age or older. The average household size was 2.20 and the average family size was 2.80. It was reported that in Advance, 0.2% of all households contain lesbians.

For people in the city aged 15 and over, 55.0% were married, 9.9% were divorced, 14.8% were single, never married, 19.0% were widowed, and 1.3% were separated.

In the city the population was spread out, with 19.6% under the age of 18, 8.5% from 18 to 24, 23.2% from 25 to 44, 22.2% from 45 to 64, and 26.5% who were 65 years of age or older. The median age was 44 years. For every 100 females, there were 76.2 males. For every 100 females age 18 and over, there were 69.2 males.

The median income for a household in the city was $27,734, and the median income for a family was $38,167. Males had a median income of $27,833 versus $19,702 for females. The per capita income for the city was $15,036. About 8.1% of families and 12.9% of the population were below the poverty line, including 16.6% of those under age 18 and 13.5% of those age 65 or over.

Education 
The Advance R-4 School District runs throughout most of the northern parts of Stoddard County as well as the extreme southern portions of Bollinger County. There is a preschool, one elementary school for grades K-6 and a consolidated junior-senior high school for grades 7-12 with an average yearly enrollment of 500 students in the district. The school colors are orange and black and its mascot is the hornet. Athletics at the school consist of boys' and girls' basketball, girls' volleyball, baseball, softball (spring season), cheerleading, boys' golf, and coed cross country.

The 2018-2019 Advance Lady Hornets volleyball team were Class 1 state champions, the school's first-ever state title. The Lady Hornets retained their Class 1 state championship during the 2019-2020 and 2020-2021 seasons. Advance returned to the Class 1 state tournament during the 2022-2023 season and won the Class 1 state championship. 

The Advance Hornets boys basketball team took second place at the Class 1 state tournament during the 2016-2017.

Notable people
Bill Burlison, politician
Dewayne Staats, broadcaster for the Tampa Bay Rays

References

External links
 Unlocking the Past by Madeline DeJournett and Elfreda Cox is a history of more than a dozen abandoned towns in the north Stoddard County area near Advance.

Cities in Stoddard County, Missouri
1910 establishments in Missouri
Cities in Missouri